USS Saturn is a name used more than once by the United States Navy:

 , an iron collier, was launched during 1890 by Harlan & Hollingsworth Co., Wilmington, Delaware
 , a cargo ship acquired by the Navy on 20 April 1942
  was a combat stores ship acquired from the United Kingdom in 1983.

United States Navy ship names